Prundu is a commune located in Giurgiu County, Muntenia, Romania. It is composed of two villages, Prundu and Puieni.

Some 300 m from the Danube, there was also a hamlet called Flămânda, inhabited by some 30 Boyash and 5-6 Romanian families. The hamlet has been depopulated since 1962, when the Danube swallowed it up and the inhabitants moved to Prundu village. The hamlet was the starting point of the Flămânda Offensive by the Romanian Army against the Central Powers in World War I.

References

Communes in Giurgiu County
Localities in Muntenia